Love Complex is the 23rd studio album by Japanese singer-songwriter Yōsui Inoue, released in June 2006.

The album features "Atarashii Koi", a song co-written by Kou Machida. It was used on the TV ad of Suntory's Old Whisky that starring Inoue, and released as a single before the album came out. Flip side of a single was "Nagai Neko", a song that Inoue's daughter Sarasa Ifu wrote the lyrics.

Track listing
All songs written and composed by Yōsui Inoue, unless otherwise noted
"11;36 Love Train" - 3:54
"Psychedelic Love Letter" - 4:09
"Navigation" - 5:32
"Mystery " - 4:17
"" (Inoue/Akiko Yano) - 5:18
"" (Inoue/Kou Machida) - 5:09
"" (Inoue/Chiharu Mikuzuki) - 3:19
"" (Inoue/Sarasa Ifu) - 3:37
"" - 3:20
"" - 4:25
"" - 5:57

Chart positions

Album

Single

Release history

References

2006 albums
Yōsui Inoue albums